James Playfair (born May 22, 1964) is a Canadian former ice hockey coach and player. He is a former NHL ice hockey player and a former head coach of the Calgary Flames. He served as an associate coach for the Arizona Coyotes from 2011 to 2017, and for the Edmonton Oilers from 2019 to 2022.

Playing career
Before making the NHL, Playfair played for the Fort Saskatchewan Traders located just north of Edmonton. He played for the Edmonton Oilers and Chicago Blackhawks over the course of his career. His older brother Larry Playfair shares a lot of the same characteristics - both were drafted in the first round of the NHL Entry Draft (Larry in 1978 and Jim in 1982), and both played junior hockey for the Portland Winter Hawks of the Western Hockey League. However, Larry played in 688 career NHL games; Jim for 21.

Coaching career
Jim Playfair became the head coach of the Calgary Flames on July 12, 2006, a promotion from his role as an assistant coach and replacing Darryl Sutter who previously had been both head coach and general manager. Sutter continued as general manager of the Flames. Playfair was also previously the head coach of the Saint John Flames of the American Hockey League, where he coached the "Baby Flames" to a Calder Cup championship in 2001. He previously lived in Calgary, Alberta with his wife Roxane, and their three sons Dylan, Jackson, and Austyn.

On June 14, 2007, Playfair was replaced as head coach of the Calgary Flames by Mike Keenan, formerly of the Florida Panthers. In his first and only season as head coach of the Flames, the team went 43–29–10 which was good enough for the eighth and final playoff spot. The team went on to be eliminated by the Detroit Red Wings in the first round 4–2.

On June 5, 2009, Playfair began his second stint as a head coach in the American Hockey League after being named the head coach of the Abbotsford Heat (Calgary Flames affiliate). In his two seasons at the helm, Playfair led the Heat to a 77–61–9–13 record (176 points). In 2009–10, he guided the Heat to the North Division finals, falling to the Hamilton Bulldogs in six games. On March 27, 2010, during one of the division final games against the Bulldogs, Playfair lost his temper and broke two hockey sticks due to penalty calls; an incident which received a half million views on YouTube in three days and for which Playfair has apologized.

He was hired as the associate coach of the Arizona Coyotes on June 13, 2011. On June 27, 2017 the Coyotes and Playfair mutually parted ways. In June 2019, he was hired as an associate coach for the Edmonton Oilers. Playfair was fired by the Oilers in February 2022, along with head coach Dave Tippett.

Playfair has joined the Prince George Cougars of the WHL as associate coach.

Personal life
He is the father of actor Dylan Playfair, known for his role as Reilly in Letterkenny as well as Gil the Pirate in The Descendants trilogy on The Disney Channel.

Career statistics

Playing career

Head coaching record

NHL

Minor leagues

See also 
Notable families in the NHL

References

External links
 

1964 births
Living people
Arizona Coyotes coaches
Calgary Flames coaches
Calgary Wranglers (WHL) players
Chicago Blackhawks players
ECHL coaches
Edmonton Oilers coaches
Edmonton Oilers draft picks
Edmonton Oilers players
Ice hockey people from British Columbia
Indianapolis Ice players
National Hockey League first-round draft picks
Nova Scotia Oilers players
People from the Regional District of Bulkley-Nechako
Portland Winterhawks players
Saginaw Hawks players
Canadian ice hockey defencemen
Canadian ice hockey coaches